Nebahat Albayrak (born 10 April 1968) is a retired Turkish–Dutch politician of the Labour Party (PvdA) and jurist. She is a corporate director at Upstream International a division of Royal Dutch Shell since 5 November 2012.

Biography 
Albayrak moved to the Netherlands in 1970. In 1993, Albayrak graduated from Leiden University in international and European law. As part of her degree, she also attended lectures in Ankara at Ankara University and the Institut d’Études Françaises, and in Paris at the Institut d’Études Politiques.

She worked at the Ministry of the Interior and Kingdom Relations from 1993 to 1998. From 1998 to 2007, she was a member of the Dutch House of Representatives.

On 22 February 2007, Nebahat Albayrak was installed as State Secretary (junior minister) for Justice in the fourth Balkenende cabinet. She and Ahmed Aboutaleb are the first Muslims in a Dutch cabinet. The right-wing Party for Freedom tried to prevent the installation of both Nebahat Albayrak and Ahmed Aboutaleb. The party also tried to pass a motion of no confidence in parliament directed against all parliamentarians or executive branch politicians with dual citizenship, claiming these politicians have a loyalty conflict or have the appearance of having one. Nebahat Albayrak has a Turkish and a Dutch passport. The motion was rejected by the House of Representatives, since no other party than the Party for Freedom supported it.

Claims of misuse of political power
In 2008, State Secretary Albayrak was accused of abusing her powers to reverse decisions made by the Immigration Service or the courts. Anonymous employees of the immigration department leaked confidential information to parliament member Sietse Fritsma (Party for Freedom) claiming Albayrak had reversed 3500 decisions "arbitrarily and without explanation". Albayrak has denied these allegations and stated she had only reversed 450 decisions. In comparison, her predecessor, Rita Verdonk (VVD), reversed 1150 decisions.

Decorations

References

External links

Official
  Mr. N. (Nebahat) Albayrak Parlement & Politiek

1968 births
Living people
Directors of Shell plc
Dutch corporate directors
Dutch Muslims
Dutch people of Turkish descent
Dutch women jurists
Knights of the Order of Orange-Nassau
Labour Party (Netherlands) politicians
Leiden University alumni
Members of the House of Representatives (Netherlands)
People from Şarkışla
Politicians from Rotterdam
State Secretaries for Justice of the Netherlands
Turkish emigrants to the Netherlands
20th-century Dutch women politicians
20th-century Dutch politicians
21st-century Dutch businesspeople
21st-century Dutch women politicians
21st-century Dutch politicians